Chagan Lake is a lake in Jilin, China. The name "Chagan" is from Mongolian (transliteration : , Cyrillic mongolian : , transliteration MNS), meaning white / pure lake (see also Chagan River re. another toponym including the Mongolian adjective tsagaan). It is often referred to as the Sacred Lake or Holy Water Lake by local people. The lake is known for its traditional winter fishing, featuring a technique which dates back to prehistoric times.

Chagan Naoer winter fishing tradition
Chagan Lake is the only place in which the oldest of Mongolian fishing methods is preserved. It is listed as a National Intangible Cultural Heritage of the People's Republic of China.

The annual Winter Fishing Festival is held to keep this ancient tradition alive. Fishermen first drill many holes through the thick ice and then use these holes to carefully position a 2 km net under the ice. The net and its catch is then hauled out of the largest hole by means of a capstan (see also Whim (mining)) turned by Mongolian horses. The principal species thus netted is the Bighead carp - a popular food fish, particularly at the Chinese New Year, when the consumption of fish is considered to bring good fortune in the year to come.

References

Lakes of China
Bodies of water of Jilin
Sacred lakes